|}

The Irish 1,000 Guineas Trial is a Group 3 flat horse race in Ireland open to three-year-old thoroughbred fillies. It is run over a distance of 1 mile (1,609 metres) at Leopardstown in May.

History
The event was formerly known as the Wassl Race. It was named after Wassl, the winner of the Irish 2,000 Guineas in 1983. For a period it held Listed status.

The name was changed to the Derrinstown Stud 1,000 Guineas Trial in 1990 when Derrinstown Stud began sponsoring the race. It was promoted to Group 3 level in 2002. In 2021 it was run without sponsorship as the Irish 1,000 Guineas Trial. The race serves as a trial for the Irish 1,000 Guineas. The last horse to win both races was Bethrah in 2010.

Records

Leading jockey since 1986 (5 wins):
 Kevin Manning – Zavaleta (1994), Speirbhean (2001), Marionnaud (2002), Alexander Goldrun (2004), Bean Feasa (2017)

Leading trainer since 1986 (9 wins):
* Aidan O'Brien – Strawberry Roan (1997), Kitza (1998), Carambola (1999), Belle Artiste (2005), Queen Cleopatra (2006), Just Pretending (2013), Kissed By Angels (2015), Joan of Arc (2021), History (2022)

Winners since 1986

See also
 Horse racing in Ireland
 List of Irish flat horse races

References
 Paris-Turf:
, 
 Racing Post:

 galopp-sieger.de – Derrinstown Stud 1,000 Guineas Trial.
 ifhaonline.org – International Federation of Horseracing Authorities – Race Detail (2019).
 pedigreequery.com – Derrinstown 1,000 Guineas Trial Stakes – Leopardstown.

Flat horse races for three-year-old fillies
Leopardstown Racecourse
Flat races in Ireland